The Yates Report, officially titled Report of the Independent Investigation to the U.S. Soccer Federation Concerning Allegations of Abusive Behavior and Sexual Misconduct in Women's Professional Soccer, is the official report documenting the findings and conclusions concerning abusive behavior and sexual misconduct in women's professional soccer. The 173-page report was publicly released by the United States Soccer Federation (USSF) on October 3, 2022. It is named for Sally Yates, the lawyer who led the investigation, who is a former Acting United States Attorney General.

Background 

The investigation was commissioned by the United States Soccer Federation on October 3, 2021, following a report by The Athletic about then-Portland Thorns manager Paul Riley's sexual harassment and coercion of players Mana Shim and Sinead Farrelly.

Among other things, the Yates Report found that the United States Center for SafeSport investigated 1,509 claims in the year from July 1, 2019 to June 30, 2020. Of those claims, it administratively closed 515 cases, put 115 cases on administrative hold, and closed 720 claims based on jurisdiction.  Of the 1,509 claims, just 122 led to a formal resolution, whereby SafeSport completed its investigation and either closed the matter or issued a decision finding a violation of the SafeSport Code. In other words, SafeSport reached a formal resolution in just 8 percent of all the cases it investigated during that period.

The Report goes on, focusing on an unusual aspect of the SafeSport process:

SafeSport has also instituted an appeals process unlike that even afforded criminal defendants. Rather than reviewing sanctions imposed by the Center for an abuse of discretion, as is required by the SafeSport Code, SafeSport gives respondents the right to what is effectively an entirely new fact-finding process, requiring the claimant to go through the process all over again. As a practical matter, respondents use the right to appeal to take another bite at the apple, in the hope that claimants will not want to rehash their claims.

In October 2022, reacting to the Yates Report, journalist Sally Jenkins wrote a column in the Washington Post about the United States Center for SafeSport. She called SafeSport “a false front … little more than another coverup operation, a litigation-avoidance ploy and bottomless pit into which to dump complaints and disguise inaction.” In conclusion, she wrote that SafeSport is "abuser-friendly," and a sham.

Recommendations
Among other things, the Yates Report made the following recommendations: "1) Teams should be required to accurately disclose misconduct to the NWSL and USSF to ensure that abusive coaches do not move from team to team; 2) USSF should require meaningful vetting of coaches and, when necessary, use its licensing authority to hold wrongdoers accountable; 3) USSF should require the NWSL to conduct timely investigations into allegations of abuse, impose appropriate discipline, and immediately disseminate investigation outcomes; and 5) Teams, the NWSL and USSF should not rely exclusively on SafeSport to keep players safe and should implement safety measures where necessary to protect players ... Given ... how infrequently SafeSport makes findings or takes action, teams, the NWSL and USSF should not rely solely on SafeSport to keep players safe."

References

External links 

 Report of the Independent Investigation to the U.S. Soccer Federation Concerning Allegations of Abusive Behavior and Sexual Misconduct in Women's Professional Soccer

Sexual misconduct allegations
United States Soccer Federation
Sexual assault in sports